Wissenkerke is a village in the Dutch province of Zeeland. It is a part of the municipality of Noord-Beveland, and lies about 20 km northeast of Middelburg.

History 
The village was first mentioned in 1230 as Wiscenkerke, and means "(private) church of Wisce". The original village was lost in the Saint Felix Flood of 1530. Only the church tower remained standing for several decades as a marker of the drowned village. 

A new settlement appeared after the polder was enclosed by a dike in 1652. In 1697, the Thoornpolder was diked resulting the loss of the harbour.

The Dutch Reformed church is an aisleless church which was built in 1969 to replace the church was from 1827. In 1860, the wind mill De Onderneming was built and the wind mill Landzicht followed in 1869.

In 1816, the village of Kampensnieuwland was merged into Wissenkerke. Wissenkerke was home to 1,871 people in 1840. Wissenkerke then remained a separate municipality until 1995 when it was merged into Noord-Beveland.

Gallery

See also 
 's-Gravenhoek

References

Municipalities of the Netherlands disestablished in 1995
Populated places in Zeeland
Former municipalities of Zeeland
Noord-Beveland